State Route 454 (SR 454) is state highway in Sevier County, Tennessee. It serves as bypass of Sevierville and Pigeon Forge and a route to the Gatlinburg Arts and Crafts Community.

Route description

SR 454 begins on the border on the city of Gatlinburg and the town of Pittman Center at an intersection with US 321/SR 73. It goes north as Buckhorn Road through hilly terrain and is very curvy. At an intersection with Glades Road, SR 454 becomes Birds Creek Road and follows closely to Bird Creek. It then comes to an end at SR 416 northeast of Gatlinburg, northwest of Pittman Center and east of Pigeon Forge.

Junction list

See also

References

Transportation in Sevier County, Tennessee
454
Gatlinburg, Tennessee